Casio calculator character sets are a group of character sets used by various Casio calculators and pocket computers.

Code charts

fx-9860G series

Character set 0x7F

Character set 0xE5

Character set 0xE6

Character set 0xF9 

 Back control code.
 Forward control code.
 Down control code.
 First from left control code.

FX-702P series

FX-730P

FX-850P, FX-880P, FX-890P, Z-1, Z-1GR

See also 
Calculator character sets

References 

Calculator character sets